MLK are the initials of Martin Luther King Jr. (1929–1968).

MLK or mlk may also refer to: 

MLK, Milk
MLK, the Northwest Semitic spelling of Malik (king).
MLK, the Phoenician spelling of the deity Moloch

Transportation
MLK, IATA airport code for Malta Airport (Montana), USA
MLK, ICAO airline code for Nigeria's Millennium Air, see List of airline codes (M)
MLK, on List of Amtrak stations, for Moses Lake, Washington, USA
MLK, station code for Mooroolbark railway station, Melbourne, Victoria, Australia
MLK Jr. station (Capital MetroRail), in Austin, Texas, USA
MLK Jr. station (DART), in Dallas, Texas, USA

People
 Manohar Lal Khattar, Chief minister of Haryana; Indian politician
 Mary Louise Kelly, NPR reporter
 Martin Luther King Sr.
 Martin Luther King III

Other
"MLK" (song), from the 1984 U2 album The Unforgettable Fire
M.L.K.: Misery Loves Kompany (Tech N9ne album), 2007 album by Tech N9ne
Ilwana language (ISO 639 code: mlk)
Marxist–Leninist Struggle League,  (MLK) in native Swedish

See also

Martin Luther King (disambiguation)
List of streets named after Martin Luther King Jr.